Churubusco-Franklin Centre is a border crossing connecting Franklin, Quebec to Churubusco, New York on the Canada–US border. Since the U.S. committed to building a new $6.8 Million border inspection station at Churubusco, at the same time Canada committed to closing its Franklin Centre border station,  travelers may enter the US from Canada via southbound Quebec Route 209 at this location, but they must return via another route instead of taking northbound New York State Route 189. This is the only US-entry-only border crossing with Canada.

Canada closed its port of entry on April 1, 2011, and tore down its border inspection station soon thereafter.  The US completed work on its new border inspection station and tore down its old border station in 2012.

Prior to 1968, the US had no border inspection station at this crossing.  The US Customs Service operated an office in rented space in a small duplex storefront near Ellenburg, New York and people entering the US at this location were expected to travel there to report for inspection.

See also
 List of Canada–United States border crossings

References

Canada–United States border crossings
Geography of Montérégie
Geography of Clinton County, New York
1933 establishments in New York (state)
1933 establishments in Quebec
2012 disestablishments in Quebec